Archbishop John Reesinck (22 February 1881–07 November 1953), was a  Dutch Roman Catholic bishop, belonging to the order of the Mill Hill Missionaries. He served as Vicar Apostolic of Upper Nile District of the Roman Catholic Archdiocese of Tororo, from 1938, until is resignation in March 1951.

Background and education
Reesinck was born on 22 February 1881 in Delft, Netherlands. He was ordained Priest on 19 September 1908 for the Mill Hill Missionaries.

As bishop
He was appointed Vicar Apostolic of Upper Nile District of the Roman Catholic Archdiocese of Tororo, on 29 March 1938. He was appointed, the same day as bishop. On 1 May 1938, he was consecrated, in London, United Kingdom, taking the title of Titular Archbishop of Thinis. He served in that role until his resignation in March 1951.

His principal consecrator was Cardinal Arthur Hinsley, Archbishop of Westminster, England, assisted by Bishop Arthur Henry Doubleday, Bishop of Brentwood, England and Bishop Edward Myers, Titular Bishop of Lamus.

In retirement
Bishop Reesinck died on 7 November 1963 at the age of 82, as Vicar Apostolic Emeritus of Upper Nile, Uganda.

Other considerations
As a tribute to the bishop, some catholic-founded schools have dormitories named in honour of Bishop John Reesinck. In Uganda, schools such as St. Peter's College, Tororo, and Namilyango College, have dormitories (Reesinck House) that are named after Bishop John Reesinck.

References

External links
Historical Summary of the Archdiocese of Tororo

1881 births
1963 deaths
20th-century Dutch Roman Catholic priests
20th-century Roman Catholic titular bishops
20th-century Roman Catholic bishops in Uganda
Roman Catholic bishops of Tororo